Crossroads: Cruce de Caminos is the title of a studio album released by Regional Mexican band Intocable. This album became their fourth number-one set on the Billboard Top Latin Albums, and was released in a standard CD presentation, CD/DVD combo including bonus materials and a Fan Edition with an extra track.

Track listing 
The track listing from Billboard.com

CD and CD/DVD

Fan Edition 
On October 23, 2007 a Fan Edition was released with the same track list and a new song titled "Me Faltas Tú" and bonus features.

Personnel 
This information from Allmusic.
 Lloyd Maines — Acoustic guitar, dobro, pedal steel, arranger, producer, guest appearance, mixing
 René Martínez — Producer, executive producer, mixing, drums, group member
 Nicolas Barry — Piano, project coordinator, guest appearance
 Alan Baxter — Executive producer, project coordinator
 Brian Beken — Fiddle, guest appearance
 Junior Cabral — Banjo, mandolin, arranger, guest appearance
 Mickey Cevallos — Photography
 Cory Churko — Fiddle, guest appearance
 José Ángel Farías — Mixing, group member
 Marco Gamboa — Piano, Hammond organ, engineer, guest appearance
 José Angel González — Mixing, group member
 Jose Juan Hernandez — Rhythm, mixing, animation, group member
 Tomas Jacobi — Project coordinator
 John Karpowich — Engineer
 Marc Muller — Acoustic guitar, mandolin, pedal steel, lap steel guitar, guest appearance
 Paul Olivarri — Production coordination
 Marco A. Ramírez — Mastering
 Silvestre Rodríguez — Mixing, group member
 Johnny Lee Rosas — Bass, mixing, vocals, group member
 Jack Saenz — Engineer, mixing
 Félix G. Salinas — Electric bass, mixing, group member
 Daniel Sánchez — Bass, mixing, segundo, group member
 Sergio Serna — Percussion, group member
Danny Reisch—Engineer
 Matt Serrechio — Assistant engineer
 John Silva — Engineer, guest appearance
 Esteban Villanueva — Project coordinator

Chart performance 

Year-End Charts

Sales and certifications

References 

2006 albums
Intocable albums
EMI Latin albums